María Emilia Attias Pompei (born March 20, 1987), better known as Emilia Attias is an Argentine actress, model, singer, DJ and television host.

Biography 
María Emilia Attías was born in the city of Buenos Aires, Argentina, on March 20, 1987. She is the fourth of five children, who had the marriage of Carlos Attias, a retired Lieutenant Colonel and former rugby coach at the Centro Naval Argentino club and Hebe Ada Rosa Pompei, a real estate businesswoman. Her parents divorced when Emilia was six years old.

Personal life 
Since 2006 Emilia was in a relationship with the actor and musician Naím Sibara. On December 3, 2009, she married Naím Sibara. On October 28, 2016 she gave birth to the couple's first child, a girl, whom they called Gina Sibara.

Career 
When María Emilia Attias was 12 years old, she was discovered on the street and from that moment she began modeling, starring in various campaigns, which helped her pay for her singing and acting classes with Norman Briski. During her teens she was a model in countless graphic campaigns and advertising, in Argentina and abroad. At age 15 she traveled to London to enter the European publishing market. María Emilia Attias began her career in television in 2003, in the youth television series Rebelde Way. In 2004, she was part of the cast of the television series Los Roldán. From 2004 to 2005, she makes a small participation in the television series No hay 2 sin 3. In 2005, she was the host of a program, called Ayer te vi. In 2005, she made her film debut, with a film of Nicolás Capelli, with the film Matar a Videla stars alongside Diego Mesaglio and María Fiorentino. In 2006, she was convened by Reina Reech and Miguel Ángel Cherutti to participate in Inolvidable, theatrical music hall. In 2006, she was part of the cast of the television series Gladiadores de Pompeya. In 2006, she was convened to participate in the contest of Bailando por un Sueño 2006. At the end of the year 2006, with 19 years old, Emilia Attias signed contract with Cris Morena to be one of the protagonist of the youth television series Casi Ángeles with Nicolás Vázquez, Alejo García Pintos, Jimena Barón, Gastón Dalmau, Nicolás Riera, Juan Pedro Lanzani, Mariana Espósito, María Eugenia Suárez, Rocío Igarzábal, Pablo Martínez, Agustín Sierra, Candela Vetrano, María Del Cerro, Stéfano de Gregorio, Gimena Accardi, Julia Calvo, Mariano Torre, Victorio D´Alessandro, Daniela Aita, Mercedes Funes, Lucas Ferraro and Peto Menahem. In 2010, she was the host of a youth program, called Re-creo en vos. In 2010, she was convened again to participate in the contest of Bailando 2010. In 2010, she and her husband Naím Sibara creates, the production company Siamese Productions, which merged with the Israeli production company AmjaTV, made the pilot for Minou. In October 2011, she acted in the movie Días de vinilo . In 2011, she acted in the movie El secreto de Lucía. In 2012, she was the protagonist of the television series Los únicos with Nicolás Vázquez and Nicolás Cabré. In 2013, she was the host of a program, called Reef Classic Pilsener Light Montañita 2013. In 2013, she makes a small participation in the television seriesLos Vecinos en Guerra. From 2013 to 2014, she was one of the protagonist of the television series Mis amigos de siempre. In 2014, she acted in the movie Contrasangre. In 2015, she starred in the play OrguYo, starred alongside Leticia Brédice, directed by Cristian Morales and written by Leticia Brédice. In 2015, she acted in the movie El muerto cuenta su historia. In 2015, she acted in the movie Ojalá vivas tiempos interesantes. In 2016 Emilia Attias returns to cinema with the protagonist in the movie Dolores. In 2016, she makes a small participation in the play El otro lado de la cama. In 2018, she was the protagonist in the movie La sequía. In 2019, she was the host of a program, called Resto del mundo.

Filmography

Television

Television programs

Movies

Theater

Videoclips

Awards and nominations

Discography

Studio albums

Live albums

Simple

Video clips

Soundtracks

References

External links 
 

21st-century Argentine women singers
Argentine people of Spanish descent
Singers from Buenos Aires
Argentine film actresses
Argentine television actresses
Argentine stage actresses
1987 births
Living people
Participants in Argentine reality television series
Bailando por un Sueño (Argentine TV series) participants